Osuna is a town and municipality in the province of Seville, southern Spain, in the autonomous community of Andalusia. , it has a population of c. 17,800. It is the location of the Andalusian Social Economy School.

Among famous people associated with Osuna is Juan de Ayala, the commander of the first European ship to enter the San Francisco Bay in California.

The battle of Munda, the last battle won by Julius Caesar in person, was probably fought outside Osuna, halfway to Écija near La Lantejuela.

In popular culture 
In Michelangelo Antonioni's film, The Passenger, the character Locke (played by Jack Nicholson) is assassinated in a hotel set in Osuna (Hotel de la Gloria), although actually filmed in Vera (Almería), Spain.

In 2014, parts of the fifth season of HBO's Game of Thrones were filmed in the town.

See also 
 List of Dukes of Osuna
Turdetani
 University of Osuna
Collegiate Church of Osuna

References

External links
Information about Osuna from the Andalusian Statistical Institute (in Spanish).
Photo Essay on Osuna 

Municipalities of the Province of Seville
House of Osuna